CAP 2 Intentos is a 2016 Venezuelan documentary film written and directed by . The film focuses on the two non-consecutive tenures of President Carlos Andrés Pérez.

The film was awarded the Algo de Cine Association Award in the Best Documentary category.

See also 

 Tiempos de dictadura
 El pueblo soy yo
Rómulo Resiste

References

External links 
 
 CAP 2 Intentos at FilmAffinity
 #Documental - CAP 2 Intentos at YouTube

2016 documentary films
2010s Spanish-language films
Venezuelan documentary films
Documentary films about Venezuela